Harris Bank Addition II is a  tall skyscraper in Chicago, Illinois. It was completed in 1974 and has 38 floors. Skidmore, Owings and Merrill designed the building in the International style which is the 83rd tallest in Chicago and has  of floor space. It houses offices and a branch for BMO Harris Bank. The building is located at the southeast corner of Monroe and LaSalle Streets and is set back from the property line of Monroe Street to allow a small plaza and fountain.

The addition is part of the Harris Bank complex which consists of the original 20-story building constructed in 1911, a 23-story structure to the east constructed in 1958 and the 38-story tower to the west. The 1958 building was also designed by Skidmore, Owings and Merrill and both additions are faced with glass and stainless steel. The 1958 structure bears the address of 111 West Monroe Street and the 1910 building is at 119 West Monroe Street. Together, these two buildings contain . All three buildings are connected on 15 floors allowing occupants to cross through the entire complex. The street levels of both additions is recessed to allow for a narrow pedestrian arcade. The second addition houses a Harris Bank branch on the street level while the first addition houses retail stores.

The lower five floors are faced with pink granite while the upper floors are red brick. Two bas-relief sculptures of lions which were used in the bank's logo until a name change in 2011. Above the entrance are four granite columns which extend from the second to fifth floors. The original cornice was removed at an unknown date.

The entire complex is managed by CommonWealth Partners, Management Services.

As part of a deal to sell the James R. Thompson Center to Google, the state of Illinois received cash plus title to the Harris Bank II building.  The structure's current owner, JRTC Holdings, will renovate the facility to suit the needs of the state offices currently located in the Thompson Center before they relocate.

See also
List of tallest buildings in Chicago

References

Chicago Architecture

Skyscraper office buildings in Chicago
Buildings and structures completed in 1974
Skidmore, Owings & Merrill buildings
1974 establishments in Illinois